99 Bishopsgate is a commercial skyscraper in London. It is located on Bishopsgate, a major thoroughfare in the City of London financial district. There are a further three plant floors at levels LG, 14 and 27.

The original core and steelwork was completed in 1976. At the time, it had the fastest lifts in Europe, running at up to 6.5 metres per second. The building was occupied solely by HSBC until the organisation moved to 8 Canada Square at Canary Wharf (that building subsequently became known as the HSBC Tower).

99 Bishopsgate was extensively damaged in 1993 by a truck bomb exploded by the Provisional IRA, which also damaged the neighbouring Tower 42.

The building was fully refurbished over a period of 14 months, which resulted in substantially improved cladding and a façade overrun which increased its overall height slightly. Larger, open plan floorplates were also created. It re-opened in mid-1995 as a multi-let office tower and is currently owned (leasehold) by Hammerson and managed by CBRE Group.

CBRE has produced an energy performance certificate (EPC) for 99 Bishopsgate which has resulted in a 'C' rating for the building. The factors that influenced the rating are the impact of specifying energy efficient plant and equipment during refits and the standard of building-related information made available for the purposes of EPC calculation. Considering the age of the building, a 'C' rating is considered impressive.

A public right of way exists through the building as part of the City of London 'highwalk' system, connecting a pedestrian bridge over London Wall to the walkways around Tower 42.

Tenants

Brookfield
Huawei Technologies
IDI Gazeley
Korea Development Bank
Latham & Watkins
MBIA
RELX

See also
100 Bishopsgate, a skyscraper under construction opposite
Heron Tower, located at 110 Bishopsgate
List of tallest buildings and structures in London
St Ethelburga's Bishopsgate, a church opposite
22 Bishopsgate, a skyscraper under construction nearby

External links
Official website
Entry on emporis.com

References

Skyscrapers in the City of London
Buildings and structures in the City of London
Office buildings completed in 1976
1976 establishments in England